John Walgrave Halford Fremantle, 4th Baron Cottesloe, 5th Baron Fremantle, GBE, TD (2 March 1900 – 21 April 1994) was a British aristocrat and public official. He served as the Chairman of the Arts Council of Great Britain and the South Bank Theatre Board.

Biography

Early life
John Fremantle was born at Holton Park, Oxfordshire, on 2 March 1900. He was the son of Colonel Thomas Fremantle, 3rd Baron Cottesloe and his wife Frances Tapling, the daughter of industrialist Thomas Tapling Senior and sister of MP Thomas Keay Tapling Jr. He was educated at New Beacon, Eton, and Trinity College, Cambridge. At Cambridge, he was a member of the University Pitt Club. He rowed for the Cambridge University Boat Club in both the Boat Race of 1921 and the Boat Race of 1922, winning both times, and graduated from Cambridge in 1925 with a Master of Arts (M.A.).

Career
He served as Lieutenant-Colonel of the 21st LAA Regiment, Royal Artillery from 1939 to 1965 and served in World War II, being awarded the Territorial Decoration.

He was a Conservative Party member of the London County Council representing Hampstead from 1945 until 1955.

He succeeded to the title Baron Fremantle and Baron Cottesloe on the death of his father on 19 July 1956. He was a Deputy Lieutenant of London from 1951 to 1976 and was invested as a Knight Grand Cross, Order of the British Empire (G.B.E.) in 1960. He was Chairman of the Arts Council of Great Britain from 1960 to 1965.

The Cottesloe, one of the three theatres at the National Theatre complex in London, was named in his honour.

Personal life
He  married, firstly, Lady Elizabeth Harris, daughter of James Edward Harris, 5th Earl of Malmesbury and Dorothy Gough-Calthorpe, on 16 February 1926.  Lady Harris was a distant cousin of Fremantle through their shared British North American ancestry - both were descendant of different members of the Dutch American Schuyler family who were Loyalists during the American Revolutionary War.
 
They had two children:
 John Fremantle, 5th Baron Cottesloe
 Hon. Ann Fremantle, m. Sir Timothy Brooks
Lord Cottesloe and Lady Elizabeth divorced in 1944.

He married, secondly, Gloria Jean Irene Dunn, daughter of W. E. Hill, on 26 March 1959.
They had three children:
 Hon. Edward Fremantle
 Hon. Elizabeth Fremantle
 Hon. Flora Fremantle.

He died in 1994.

See also
List of Cambridge University Boat Race crews

References

External links
National Portrait Gallery

of the Austrian Empire

1900 births
1994 deaths
People educated at Eton College
British male rowers
Royal Artillery officers
British Army personnel of World War II
Cottesloe, John Walgrave Halford Fremantle, 4th Baron
Stewards of Henley Royal Regatta
Knights Grand Cross of the Order of the British Empire
Deputy Lieutenants of the County of London
Alumni of Trinity College, Cambridge
Members of London County Council
British people of Dutch descent
Eldest sons of British hereditary barons
Schuyler family
Barons of Austria